Marshallopsis is a genus of minute sea snails, marine gastropod molluscs in the family Cerithiopsidae.

Species
Species in the genus Marshallopsis include:
 Marshallopsis aboreensis Cecalupo & Perugia, 2017
 Marshallopsis albachiarae Cecalupo & Perugia, 2012
 Marshallopsis albicans Cecalupo & Perugia, 2012
 Marshallopsis anceps Cecalupo & Perugia, 2013
 Marshallopsis atrata Cecalupo & Perugia, 2012
 Marshallopsis bazzocchii Cecalupo & Perugia, 2014
 Marshallopsis blanda Cecalupo & Perugia, 2012
 Marshallopsis boucheti Cecalupo & Perugia, 2012
 Marshallopsis chirlii Cecalupo & Perugia, 2014
 Marshallopsis flavescens Cecalupo & Perugia, 2013
 Marshallopsis gattellii Cecalupo & Perugia, 2012
 Marshallopsis gofasi Cecalupo & Perugia, 2017
 Marshallopsis granosa Cecalupo & Perugia, 2012
 Marshallopsis jolandae Cecalupo & Perugia, 2013
 Marshallopsis kantori Cecalupo & Perugia, 2013
 Marshallopsis letourneuxi Cecalupo & Perugia, 2014
 Marshallopsis limpida Cecalupo & Perugia, 2012
 Marshallopsis lorenzoi Cecalupo & Perugia, 2012
 Marshallopsis maesta Cecalupo & Perugia, 2012
 Marshallopsis melanesiana Cecalupo & Perugia, 2013
 Marshallopsis nagoensis Cecalupo & Perugia, 2018
 Marshallopsis perinii Cecalupo & Perugia, 2013
 Marshallopsis persicina Cecalupo & Perugia, 2018
 Marshallopsis sabellii Cecalupo & Perugia, 2019
 Marshallopsis spadicea Cecalupo & Perugia, 2018 
 Marshallopsis spinosa Cecalupo & Perugia, 2013
 Marshallopsis tahitiensis Cecalupo & Perugia, 2014
 Marshallopsis troendlei Cecalupo & Perugia, 2014
 Marshallopsis turgida Cecalupo & Perugia, 2012
 Marshallopsis tutubaensis Cecalupo & Perugia, 2013
 Marshallopsis utriculus Cecalupo & Perugia, 2017
Species brought into synonymy
 Marshallopsis inopinata Cecalupo & Perugia, 2012: synonym of Prolixodens inopinata (Cecalupo & Perugia, 2012)
 Marshallopsis lutea Cecalupo & Perugia, 2012: synonym of Prolixodens lutea (Cecalupo & Perugia, 2012)
 Marshallopsis obscura Cecalupo & Perugia, 2012: synonym of Prolixodens obscura (Cecalupo & Perugia, 2012)

References

 Cecalupo A. & Perugia I. (2012) Family Cerithiopsidae H. Adams & A. Adams, 1853 in the central Philippines (Caenogastropoda: Triphoroidea). Quaderni della Civica Stazione Idrobiologica di Milano 30: 1-262.
 Cecalupo, A., & Perugia, I., 2013 The Cerithiopsidae (Caenogastropoda: Triphoridea) of Espiritu Santo, Vanuatu (South Pacific Ocean), p. 253 pp

Cerithiopsidae